Tim Natusch (born 3 July 1986 in Papua) is a professional rugby league footballer who currently plays for the Wynnum Manly Seagulls in the Queensland Cup.

To further his sporting ambitions Natusch attended Wellington College. Due to the distance between his home in Waikanae and school in Wellington, Natusch would regularly stay at his sister's in Karori. During this time he was a regular edition to the Number 21 Wright's Hill school bus. Other past well known travellers on this service include Robert Ford, James Speight, Russell Weir and Tom Everton.

During his time at Wellington College, Natucsh was a crucial part to the 2ND XV in 2003. It was this team in which Tim was inducted into the "Dog Pound Gang" or D.P.G (a secretive group of selected members, little is known about this formidable group) by the presidents Fraser Gyde and Nick White. Tim has gained the most media success out of all the D.P.G members, through publication in the  New Zealand Herald and his NRL appearances.

Wellington College, a rugby based school did not promote rugby league or support union players trying out the game. Natusch was actively discouraged from entering rugby league by his then union coach John Mills, an uncapped All Black who in 2009 joined Graham Henry's All Black coaching staff in an advisory role. In 2004 Tim played his first rugby league game for the club Harbor City coached by David Fien. Dallas Penetito, Isaac Monk-Tainaghoe and Adam Cahill also played for this team. Tim attracted widespread support as a professional rugby league footballer immediately with his large upper frame, strong tackle and light feet.

He then played his junior rugby league in New Zealand with the Te Aroha Eels in the Wellington competition before moving to Australia in 2005 to join a scholarship program with the Knights.

Natusch made his first grade debut against the South Sydney Rabbitohs in Round 3 2009 on 29 March 2009.

On 1 October 2009 it was announced he had signed with the Brisbane Broncos on a 1-year deal.

After not playing a game with the Broncos, Natusch joined Intrust Super Cup side Wynnum Manly Seagulls in 2011. In 2014 he became their captain.

References

External links
Wynnum Manly Seagulls profile

1986 births
Living people
Lakes United Seagulls players
New Zealand people of Papua New Guinean descent
Newcastle Knights players
Papua New Guinean emigrants to New Zealand
Papua New Guinean rugby league players
People educated at Wellington College (New Zealand)
People from Waikanae
Rugby league props
Wynnum Manly Seagulls players